Engolzha (Öŋölcö) is a rural locality (a selo), the only inhabited locality, and the administrative center of Markhinsky Rural Okrug of Nyurbinsky District in the Sakha Republic, Russia, located  from Nyurba, the administrative center of the district. Its population as of the 2010 Census was 563, of whom 272 were male and 291 female, up from 538 as recorded during the 2002 Census.

References

Notes

Sources
Official website of the Sakha Republic. Registry of the Administrative-Territorial Divisions of the Sakha Republic. Nyurbinsky District. 

Rural localities in Nyurbinsky District